Makkai is a surname. Notable people with the surname include:

Michael Makkai (born 1939), Canadian mathematician
Rebecca Makkai (born 1978), American writer